The Golden Stallion can refer to:

 The Golden Stallion (1927 film), a 1927 silent film
 The Golden Stallion (1949 film), a 1949 film
 Golden Stallion of Yennenga, the main film prize awarded by the Panafrican Film and Television Festival of Ouagadougou